
 
 

Western Flat is a locality in the Australian state of South Australia located in the state's south-east within the Limestone Coast region about  south east of the state capital of Adelaide and about  south of the municipal seat of Bordertown.

Boundaries for the locality were created on 16 March 2000  for the “long established name.”  Its name is ultimately derived from the ‘Western Flat Run’ pastoral lease which was established in 1868 by T. Brown.

The land use in the locality is ‘primary production’.

The 2016 Australian census which was conducted in August 2016 reports that Western Flat had a population of 121 people.

Western Flat is located within the federal division of Barker, the state electoral district of MacKillop and the local government area of the Tatiara District Council.

References

Towns in South Australia
Limestone Coast